Elden Heart Rowland (May 31, 1915 – February 22, 1982) was an artist in Sarasota, Florida. His wife, Katherine Rowland, wrote A Painter and His Wife: A Memoir: Elden Rowland, Painter, Katherine Rowland, Wife about their life in the arts in Sarasota, Cape Cod and Montana. It is illustrated with 50 pictures. They moved from Ohio to Florida.

Rowland was born May 31, 1915, in Cincinnati, Ohio. He married Katherine Lucile Lollar in Lebanon, Ohio, on May 13, 1939, and they moved to Florida to pursue his career as an artist. Rowland was instrumental in promoting the local arts scene including Art Center Sarasota (then the Sarasota Arts Center). In 1948 they made their home in Siesta Key. Rowland taught and painted. He is most known for his abstract expressionist work from the 1960s. He died on February 22, 1982, in Sarasota.

References

1915 births
1982 deaths
Artists from Cincinnati
Painters from Ohio
People from Sarasota, Florida
Painters from Florida
20th-century American painters
American male painters
20th-century American male artists